Intriga en Lima is a 1965 Argentine film.

Cast
 Vicente Buono
 Joe Danda
 Joe Danova
 Graciela Dufau
 Jorge Montoro

External links
 

1965 films
1960s Spanish-language films
Argentine black-and-white films
1960s Argentine films